Umri is a town and a nagar panchayat in Jalaun district in the Indian state of Uttar Pradesh.

Demographics
 India census, Umri had a population of 8,816. Males constitute 54% of the population and females 46%. Umri has an average literacy rate of 60%, higher than the national average of 59.5%: male literacy is 70%, and female literacy is 48%. In Umri, 16% of the population is under 6 years of age.

References

Cities and towns in Jalaun district